Zosimos of Panopolis (also known by the Latin name Zosimus Alchemista, i.e. "Zosimus the Alchemist") was a Greco-Egyptian alchemist and Gnostic mystic who lived at the end of the 3rd and beginning of the 4th century AD. He was born in Panopolis (present day Akhmim, in the south of Roman Egypt), and flourished ca. 300. He wrote the oldest known books on alchemy, which he called "Cheirokmeta," using the Greek word for "things made by hand." Pieces of this work survive in the original Greek language and in translations into Syriac or Arabic. He is one of about 40 authors represented in a compendium of alchemical writings that was probably put together in Constantinople in the 7th or 8th century AD, copies of which exist in manuscripts in Venice and Paris.  Stephen of Alexandria is another.

Arabic translations of texts by Zosimos were discovered in 1995 in a copy of the book Keys of Mercy and Secrets of Wisdom by Ibn Al-Hassan Ibn Ali Al-Tughra'i', a Persian alchemist. Unfortunately, the translations were incomplete and 

seemingly non-verbatim. The famous index of Arabic books, Kitab al-Fihrist by Ibn Al-Nadim, mentions earlier translations of four books by Zosimos, but  due to inconsistency in transliteration, these texts were attributed  to names "Thosimos", "Dosimos" and "Rimos"; also it is possible that two of them are translations of the same book.
Fuat Sezgin, a historian of Islamic science, found 15 manuscripts of Zosimos in six libraries, at Tehran, Cairo, Istanbul, Gotha, Dublin and Rampur. Michèle Mertens analyzed what is known about those manuscripts in her translation of Zosimos, concluding that the Arabic tradition seems extremely rich and promising, and regretting the difficulty of access to these materials until translated editions are available.

Alchemy

Zosimos provided one of the first definitions of alchemy as the study of "the composition of waters, movement, growth, embodying and disembodying, drawing the spirits from bodies and bonding the spirits within bodies."

In general, Zosimos' understanding of alchemy reflects the influence of Hermetic and Gnostic spiritualities. He asserted that the fallen angels taught the arts of metallurgy to the women they married, an idea also recorded in the Book of Enoch and later repeated in the Gnostic Apocryphon of John. In a fragment preserved by Syncellus, Zosimos wrote:

The external processes of metallic transmutation—the transformations of lead and copper into silver and gold were said to always to mirror an inner process of purification and redemption. In his work Concerning the true Book of Sophe, the Egyptian, and of the Divine Master of the Hebrews and the Sabaoth Powers, Zosimos wrote:

Greek alchemists used what they called ὕδωρ θεῖον, meaning both divine water, and sulphurous water. For Zosimos, the alchemical vessel was imagined as a baptismal font, and the tincturing vapours of mercury and sulphur were likened to the purifying waters of baptism, which perfected and redeemed the Gnostic initiate. Zosimos drew upon the Hermetic image of the krater or mixing bowl, a symbol of the divine mind in which the Hermetic initiate was "baptized" and purified in the course of a visionary ascent through the heavens and into the transcendent realms. Similar ideas of a spiritual baptism in the "waters" of the transcendent pleroma are characteristic of the Sethian Gnostic texts unearthed at Nag Hammadi. This image of the alchemical vessel as baptismal font is central to his Visions, discussed below.

Carl Jung and the Visions of Zosimos
One of Zosimos' texts is about a sequence of dreams related to Alchemy, and presents the proto-science as a much more religious experience. In his dream he first comes to an altar and meets Ion, who calls himself "the priest of inner sanctuaries, and I submit myself to an unendurable torment." Ion then fights and impales Zosimos with a sword, dismembering him "in accordance with the rule of harmony" (referring to the division into four bodies, natures, or elements). He takes the pieces of Zosimos to the altar, and "burned (them) upon the fire of the art, till I perceived by the transformation of the body that I had become spirit." From there, Ion cries blood, and horribly melts into "the opposite of himself, into a mutilated anthroparion"—which Carl Jung perceived as the first concept of the homunculus in alchemical literature.

Zosimos wakes up, asks himself, "Is not this the composition of the waters?" and returns to sleep, beginning the visions again—he constantly wakes up, ponders to himself and returns to sleep during these visions. Returning to the same altar, Zosimos finds a man being boiled alive, yet still alive, who says to him, "The sight that you see is the entrance, and the exit, and the transformation ... Those who seek to obtain the art (or moral perfection) enter here, and become spirits by escaping from the body"—which can be regarded as human distillation; just as how distilling water purifies it, distilling the body purifies it as well. He then sees a Brazen Man (another homunculus, as Jung believed any man described as being metal is perceived as being a homunculus), a Leaden Man (an "agathodaemon" and also a homunculus, but see also Agathodaemon the alchemist). Zosimos also dreams of a "place of punishments" where all who enter immediately burst into flames and submit themselves to an "unendurable torment."

Jung believed these visions to be a sort of Alchemical allegory, with the tormented homunculi personifying transmutations—burning or boiling themselves to become something else. The central image of the visions are the Sacrificial Act, which each Homunculus endures. In alchemy the dyophysite nature is constantly emphasized, two principles balancing one another, active and passive, masculine and feminine, which constitute the eternal cycle of birth and death. This is also illustrated in the figure of the uroboros, the dragon that bites its own tail (and which appears earliest in the Chrysopoeia).  Self-devouring is the same as self-destruction, but the unison of the dragon's tail and mouth was also thought of as self-fertilization. Hence the text of "Tractatus Avicennae" mentions "the dragon slays itself, weds itself, impregnates itself." In the visions, circular thinking appears in the sacrificial priest's identity with his victim and in the idea that the homunculus into whom Ion is changed devours himself—he spews fourth his own flesh and rends himself with his own teeth. The homunculus therefore stands for the uroboros, which devours itself and gives birth to self. Since the homunculus represents the transformation of Ion, it follows that Ion, the uroboros, and the sacrificer are essentially the same.

The Book of Pictures
This book is divided into 13 chapters, each of them being introduced by a separate image. 
Two chapters contain a whole series of images, which - according to Zosimos' statements - are meant to be pondered upon in order to better understand his teaching.

The whole text gives a lively dialogue between an alchemical couple: i.e. Zosimos and his female student Theosebeia, revolving about Zosimos' teaching. It reports Theosebeia's complaining about unclear statements of Zosimos as well as Zosimos' anger about her inability to understand his statements. At first sight, the dialogue deals with question upon how to understand statements of alchemical philosophers like Agathodaimon, Democritos, Isis, Moses, Maria, Ostanes, as well as with questions about technical aspects of the alchemical work. But again and again, Zosimos emphasises that he does not talk about the substances and processes as such, as matter, but that they have to be understood symbolically. Zosimos describes the alchemical work by means of a series of images and says to Theosebeia: "What I wrote and told you, and with the picture I made for you with me in it, I gave you what you need to know, and this should be enough for you.". He also states, that these images depict his own innerpsychic process of transformation.

Zosimos' teaching is based on the one hand on his own dream visions, reported in the text. Another source for his teaching was his suffering of a passionate love relationship to Theosebeia, being not allowed to be simply lived out physically. This led him to understand the alchemical work as psychic transformation, enabling the adept to hold and contain the fire of attraction. Correspondingly, Zosimos drew symbolic images of his own death and resurrection as explanation for Theosebeia.
Following Abt, the book can be regarded as the earliest historical description of an alchemical work based on a psychic transformation." And it "is a testimony of the painstaking quest to understand not only the problem but also the meaning of attraction, repulsion and ultimate reconciliation between the outer male and female as well as the inner fire and water" a process that "is described [...] with basic substances, mirroring the very elemental, collective character of this process."

In this book, we find fragments of writings from "The Sulfurs", which are ascribed to Zosimos and from his "Letters to Theosebeia". In the course of the dialogue, those fragments seem to be interrupted by Theosebeia's questions and by further explanations. By this, Zosimos' teaching is presented in an easier and more understandable way, as Abt holds.

With regard to content and style, there are similarities between both books, "the Book of Pictures" and the "Book of Keys" (see there).

Up to now, only one single Arabic manuscript of the "Book of Pictures" is extant. In the fourth part of the "Book of the Rank of the Sage (Rutbat al-Ḥakīm) its author Maslama al-Qurțubī (formerly wrongly assigned to Maslama al-Magriti) quotes extensively from the "Book of Pictures". He is the first author quoting it, but using another Greek original than the one published in 2015 than the version published 2015 (CALA III, by Th. Abt) and has influenced several alchemists like the early Arabic alchemist Ibn Umail, the "Kitab al-Habib" (Book of the Friend/Lover; including a dialogue between a so-called Rusam and Theosebeia) and the alchemist "Hermes of Dendera", author of "Risalat as-Sirr" (Epistle of the Secret; including a similar dialogue between Hermes Budasir und Amnutasiya). Other traits of Latin symbolic alchemy, like the traditional division of the work in 12 parts or the representation of inner and outer relationship between adept and soror mystica (e.g. in "Rosarium Philosophorum" and in "Mutus Liber") can be traced back to this book and seem to be influcend by it. Fragments of the text of the "Book of Pictures" can be found in "Rosarium Philosophorum" and "Artis Auriferae". (e.g. titled "Tractatus Rosini ad Euticiam" (="Treatise of Rosinus to Euticia").

The Book of Pictures itself is influenced by Ancient Egyptian thinking, its iconography showing relations to pharaonic iconography and having motifs paralleling Egyptian books of the underworld like Amduat, which was known until Greek-Roman times.
Regarding the inner and outer relationship between man and woman or between psychic male and female aspects, the "Book of Pictures" forms a cultural bridge between pharaonic thoughts and European medieval alchemy.

The Book of the Keys of the Work 
This book is written as commentary in 10 chapters on "the Book of the 10 Keys", a work ascribed to Democritus (Democritus of Abdera or Pseudo-Democritus). As at the beginning of the book (fol. 41a.3-4) is written, this commentary was Zosimos' last text written for Theosebeia. According to Abt, the book gives an essence of Zosimos' teachings, as the preamble says, that the book is so clear and understandable, that after its reading, Theosebeia "understood the [alchemical] work".

There are many parallels between the "Book of the Keys of the Work" and "The Book of Pictures" in terms of subject and style: Both books are written "to my lady" and mainly "in dialogue form, [... have] the same emphasis on the fact that there is just one alchemical operation [...], the alchemical work is one and emphasises the same central role for Democritus, 'the head of the sages of his time' [...]. The operation in both books centres on a composition of vapours [...]. It has the same essential feature of extracting the subtle with 'gentleness' [...] from all four natures, the mixture of like with like, and the need to bind the fugitive spirit. They have analogies in common, for example that of copper with the human being.
As in the "Book of Pictures", one can trace motives and symbols of Zosimos' teachings that go back to the worldview of pharaonic Egypt. Integrating these motives allows a better understanding of the text.

Surviving works

 Authentic Memoirs
 The Book of the Keys of the Work (Kitāb Mafātīḥ aṣ-ṣan'a)
 The Book of Pictures (Muṣḥaf aṣ-ṣuwar)
 Concerning the true Book of Sophe, the Egyptian, and of the Divine Master of the Hebrews and the Sabaoth Powers (French translation)
 The Final Quittance (French translation)
 Letters to Theosebeia
 On the Evaporation of  the Divine Water that fixes Mercury (French translation )
 On the Letter Omega (English excerpt translated by G.R.S. Mead; French translation)
 The Sulfurs
Treatise on Instruments and Furnaces (French translation)
 The Visions of Zosimos (English translation)

The complete (as of 1888) "Œuvres de Zosime" were published in French by M. Berthelot in Les alchimistes grecs. English translations remain elusive; English translations of the Arabic The Book of the Keys of the Work (Kitāb Mafātīḥ aṣ-ṣan'a) and The Book of Pictures (Muṣḥaf aṣ-ṣuwar) have been published by Th. Abt and W. Madelung.

See also
Alchemy and chemistry in medieval Islam
Mary the Jewess

References

Bibliography

Fragments 
 
  Vol. I (introduction) p. 119, 127—174, 209, 250; vol. II (Greek text) p. 28, 117—120; Vol. III (trans.) p. 117—242.
 p. 1—49: I = Sur la lettre oméga; V = Sur l'eau divine; VI = Diagramme (ouroboros); VII = Sur les appareils et fourneaux

Arabic works

Studies 
 
 Abt, Theodor (2011). "Introduction to the Facsimile Edition, Introduction to the Translation," in:  p. 17-139.
 Abt, Theodor (2016): "Introduction", in:  p. 11-53.
 
  Vol. I (introduction) p. 119, 127—174, 209, 250.
  Vol. II, p. 203—266; Vol. III, p. 28, 30, 41.
 
 
 
 
 Knipe, Sergio, "Sacrifice and self-transformation in the alchemical writings of Zosimus of Panopolis," in Christopher Kelly, Richard Flower, Michael Stuart Williams (eds), Unclassical Traditions. Vol. II: Perspectives from East and West in Late Antiquity (Cambridge, Cambridge University Press, 2011) (Cambridge Classical Journal, Supplemental Volume 35), 59-69.

External links
A translation of Zosimos's Three Visions by Andrew Barrett in 3:AM Magazine
 https://www.3ammagazine.com/3am/three-visions-of-zosimus/

3rd-century Egyptian people
4th-century Egyptian people
3rd-century births
4th-century deaths
Ancient alchemists
Egyptian alchemists
Gnostics
Greek alchemists
People from Sohag Governorate